Charles Ramsdell (born January 13, 1985) is a retired Malagasy-American professional basketball player.  His last team as an active player was San Sebastián Gipuzkoa BC of the Spanish Liga ACB.

He played college basketball for University of Tulsa, and also competed in high jump for Tulsa.

He represented Madagascar men's national basketball team at the AfroBasket 2011 in Antananarivo, Madagascar where he recorded most minutes, points, rebounds and blocks for his team.

References

External links
 ESPN Profile
 Eurobasket.com Profile

Videos
 Charles Ramsdell, un paso atrás para dar dos adelante – Youtube.com Video

1985 births
Living people
American expatriate basketball people in Spain
American men's basketball players
American people of Malagasy descent
Basketball players from Oklahoma
Bàsquet Manresa players
Centers (basketball)
Expatriate basketball people in Spain
Gipuzkoa Basket players
Liga ACB players
Malagasy men's basketball players
Malagasy people of American descent
Power forwards (basketball)
Sportspeople from Edmond, Oklahoma
Tulsa Golden Hurricane men's basketball players
Tulsa Golden Hurricane men's track and field athletes